TCU may stand for:

Education
 Tanzania Commission for Universities, regulatory body for Universities in Tanzania
 Texas Christian University, a private university in Fort Worth, Texas
 TCU Horned Frogs, the athletic programs of the school
 Tokyo Christian University, a private university in Chiba, Japan
 Tokyo City University, a private university in Tokyo, Japan
 Tzu Chi University, a private university in Hualien, Taiwan
 Tianjin Chengjian University, a university in Tianjin, China

Science and technology
 Telecommunication control unit, a device that regulates input and output in a mainframe computer
 Telematic control unit, a device on board of a vehicle that controls tracking of the vehicle
 Transmission control unit, a controlling device in automobile transmissions and engines
 Thompson/Center Ugalde, a family of custom ammunition cartridges for firearms
 Towering cumulus cloud (TCu), types of which are cumulus congestus or cumulus castellanus

Other
 Tauranga City United, a New Zealand association football club
 Transitional care unit, a facility in a hospital where the level of care falls between intensive care and normal care
 Transportation Communications Union, a labor group for railroad-related workers
 Triangle Credit Union, a bank in New Hampshire
 Tribunal de Contas da União, the Brazilian federal court of accounts
 Turn construction unit, a segment of speech in the study of linguistics